The 5th Lithuanian Vanguard Regiment was a military unit of the Grand Duchy of Lithuania.

History

Origins 
Formed in 1733 by gathering all cavalry units of Józef Potocki, the Voivode of Kiev Potocki family, mostly composed of Tatars.

Electorate of Saxony 
This regiment was leased to the Saxon army during the reign of Wettin dynasty and continuously fought in the War of Polish Succession (1734-1738), War of the Austrian Succession (1740-1748) and the Seven Years' War (1756-1763).

Grand Duchy of Lithuania 
In 1764, it was summoned by the Sejm of 1764 to return to Lithuania.

Bar Confederation 
The regiment fought against the Wettin dynasty's supporters.

1772-1792 
The regiment was stationed in Suchowola (1772-1789), Krynki (1789-1792 September) and Veliuona (1792 October and onwards).

War in Defence of the Constitution

The regiment fought in the war.

Kościuszko Uprising 
The regiment took part in the battle of Praga.

Uniforms 
In 1764–89, all officers and men had white cockades, with the officers and towarzycz also having white feathers on top of the cockades. The towarzycz had green belts and sashes, while the officers had gold-laces green waistcoats.

Commanders 
These were the polkovniks from 1764 to 1794:

 Hallaszewicz
 Aleksander Mustafa Korycki (-1764)
These were the polkovniks from 1764 to 1794:
 Aleksander Mustafa Korycki (1764-1774)
  (1774-1780)
 Jan Gorycz (1780-1787)
 gen. mjr  (1787-)
 Ludwik Lissowski (according to Gembarzewski, he was polkovnik, according to Machynia et al. he was podpolkovnik)

External links 
The 5th Lithuanian Vanguard Regiment is linked to the Graf Renard Uhlans

References 

Military units and formations established in 1733
Cavalry regiments of Lithuania